Chile–Taiwan relations refer to the bilateral relations between the Republic of Chile and the Republic of China (Taiwan).

Like majority states in the world, Chile adheres to One China policy, therefore it does not maintain official diplomatic ties with Taiwan. However, it does not prevent two nations to work close together, due to both countries are technically democratic, strong economic performances and allies of the United States. Both are urging to extend their cooperation together.

Chile has a cultural representative office in Taipei while Taiwan has a cultural representative office in Santiago.

History
The indigenous people of Chile might have been traced to share cultural commons with the Taiwanese aborigines for their Austronesian heritages.

In 1915, Chile established relations with the Republic of China. After the Chinese Civil War, Chile maintained relations with the ROC as the true and legitimate representative of the Republic of China until December 1970, when the government of Salvador Allende recognized Communist China.

In March 1975, during the military dictatorship of General Augusto Pinochet, Chile and Taiwan reestablished relations unofficially, Chile established the Chilean Representative Office in Taipei, while Taiwan established a Taipei Economic and Cultural Office in Santiago. By that time, thousands of Taiwanese came to Chile as immigrants to work.

Economic relations
Chile and Taiwan have been expanding trade relations, although not dramatically, but very strong and fit.

References

External links
Office of Taipei Economic and Cultural in Chile 

 
Taiwan
Bilateral relations of Taiwan